Cold antibody hemolytic anemia may refer to:
 Cold agglutinin disease
 Paroxysmal cold hemoglobinuria